is a Japanese voice actress from Iwate Prefecture. She is affiliated with 81 Produce.

Career
When Okuno graduated from high school, she told her parents that she wanted to go to a voice-acting vocational school; however, her parents were against the idea, and she ended up enrolling in a four-year university affiliated to her high school.

She went on to pass the 2nd Anison Vocal Audition of Avex and 81 Produce's Wake Up, Girls! AUDITION held in September 2012. Since 2013, she has been active as a sub-leader of voice-acting unit Wake Up, Girls!.

In January 2014, she made her voice-acting debut as Kaya Kikuma in the anime series Wake Up, Girls!.

In 2015, she won the Special Award at the 9th Seiyu Awards on Wake Up, Girls!.

In 2018, she voiced the character of Unzen Inori, who won second place at the Onsen Musume Yunohana Collection 1st General Elections (in the group-unaffiliated division), and had the opportunity to make her debut as a solo artist.

She will be the voice provider for an upcoming Cevio AI/SynthesizerV voicebank, Hanakuma Chifuyu.

Personal life 
Okuno was born in Morioka, Iwate. She has an older brother.

A fan of Sailor Moon since childhood, she would often channel Kotono Mitsuishi; she later watched Neon Genesis Evangelion, becoming enchanted with Mitsuishi's performance as Misato Katsuragi, and developed a fervent desire to meet Mitsuishi in person one day.

Okuno's favourite band is Mr. Children. She is a fan of the Hanshin Tigers and of the now-retired player Norihiro Akahoshi. She enjoys arts and crafts and playing with animals such as cats and dogs. Her special skills include playing the piano and speaking Tōhoku dialect.

Filmography

Television Animation
 Dramatical Murder (2014), Female B (ep 5)
 Hanayamata (2014), Yaya Sasame
 Wake Up, Girls! (2014), Kaya Kikuma
 When Supernatural Battles Became Commonplace (2014), Middle Schooler
 Dance with Devils (2015), Schoolgirl A (eps 1-2, 5)
 Hacka Doll the Animation (2015), Hacka Doll #2
 Saekano: How to Raise a Boring Girlfriend (2015), Azusa Satomi
 Shomin Sample (2015), Maid (eps 3, 9); Misaki Yamada (ep 5); Ojōsama
 Hundred (2016), Karen Kisaragi
 Schwarzesmarken (2016), Operator A
Death March to the Parallel World Rhapsody (2018), Tama
So I'm a Spider, So What? (2021), Filimøs/Kanami Okazaki
Girls' Frontline (2022), Scarecrow

Original Video Animation (OVA)

Original Net Animation (ONA)
 Wake Up, Girl ZOO! (2014), Kaya Kikuma

Theatrical Animation
 Wake Up, Girls! Seven Idols (2014), Kaya Kikuma
 Wake Up, Girls! Seishun no Kage (2015), Kaya Kikuma
 Wake Up, Girls! Beyond the Bottom (2015), Kaya Kikuma
 New Initial D Legend 3: Dream (2016), Sayuki

Video games
 Wake Up, Girls! Stage no Tenshi (2013), Kaya Kikuma
 Hacka Dokkan (2014), Hacka Doll #2
 Hanayamata Yosakoi Live! (2014), Yaya Sasame
 Granblue Fantasy (2015), Bridgette
 Miracle Girls Festival (2015), Kaya Kikuma
 Thousand Memories (2015), Hacka Doll #2
 Uchi no Hime-sama wa Ichiban Kawaii (2015), Komahime Chikorin Gambit
 Yome Collection (2015), Hacka Doll #2
 Drift Girls (2016), Marei Hinohara
 Girls' Frontline (2016), Dreamer, Scarecrow
 Kirara Fantasia (2017), Sasame Yaya
 The King of Fighters All Star (2020), Pretty Zero (Original), Pretty Zero (Clone)
 ALTDEUS: Beyond Chronos (2020), Coco Coconoe

Dubbing
 The Final Girls, Mimi (Lauren Gros)

References

External links
 Official agency profile 
 

1991 births
Living people
Japanese video game actresses
Japanese voice actresses
81 Produce voice actors
21st-century Japanese actresses
Voice actresses from Iwate Prefecture